Ash Ra Tempel is the eponymous debut studio album by the Krautrock band Ash Ra Tempel. Engineered by Conny Plank, it was recorded in March 1971 and released in June 1971 on Ohr. It features guitarist Manuel Göttsching with drummer Klaus Schulze and bassist Hartmut Enke. With the passing of Enke in 2005, followed by Schulze and Göttsching in 2022 all three performing musicians on this album are now deceased.

Reception
AllMusic called the album "both astonishingly prescient and just flat out good, a logical extension of the space-jam-freakout ethos into rarified realms."

Track listing

Personnel 
 Manuel Göttsching – vocals, electric guitar, electronics
 Hartmut Enke – bass guitar
 Klaus Schulze – drums, percussion, electronics

Releases
 CD	Ash Ra Tempel Spalax Music	 2001
 CD	Ash Ra Tempel Import	 2002
 Ash Ra Tempel Import	 2002
 CD	First Japanese Import	 2002
 CD	Ash Ra Tempel Disk Union	 2004
 LP	Ash Ra Tempel Phantom Import Distribution	 2004
 LP	Ash Ra Tempel Spalax Music	 2004
 CD	Ash Ra Tempel MG.ART / Music Video Distribution	 2012

References 

1971 debut albums
Ohr (record label) albums
Ash Ra Tempel albums